Black Catholic Messenger (BCM) is a nonprofit media publication covering stories of interest to African-American Catholics.

Its coverage has been featured in The Philadelphia Inquirer, La Croix, Aleteia, and the Baltimore Afro-American.

History
The publication was founded in New Orleans, Louisiana, in late 2020. Nate Tinner-Williams—inspired by the model of Daniel Rudd, the 19th- and 20th-century Black Catholic journalist from Ohio—formed a group of young African-American Catholics to create a publication that could possibly revive Rudd's journalistic legacy.

The group, consisting of Tinner-Williams and authors Alessandra Harris and Preslaysa Williams, began their work in October of that year.

The publication reports on various issues in the Catholic Church and the Black community, some of which education, episcopal governance, racism, vocations, abuse, and notable deaths. The Messenger also publishes interviews and visual art, including poetry.

Editor
Nate Tinner-Williams, a Washington, D.C. resident and a seminarian with the Josephites, serves as editor of the publication and in that capacity has been featured in America, National Catholic Reporter, and The Philadelphia Inquirer.

See also
 
 List of Catholic newspapers and magazines in the United States

References

African-American newspapers
African-American Roman Catholicism
Black-owned companies of the United States
Catholic media
Catholic newspapers published in the United States
Catholic organizations established in the 21st century
Catholic websites
newspapers established in 2020
nonprofit newspapers